Lt.-Colonel Christopher Carleton (1749–1787) was born into an Ulster military family in Newcastle-upon-Tyne, England. Christopher's parents died at sea when he was only four years old and his uncles, Guy Carleton (later created The 1st Baron Dorchester), the future Governor General of Canada and Commander-in-Chief, North America, along with Thomas Carleton, later the 1st Governor of New Brunswick, saw to his education and upbringing.  At the age of twelve, Chistopher joined the British Army as an ensign in the 31st Regiment of Foot.  Before his first tour of duty in North America, Chistopher married Anne Howard, whose sister Maria was the wife of Guy Carleton.  While in North America, Christopher Carleton met Sir William Johnson and lived among the Mohawk Indians, learning their language and partaking in their customs.  He would remark in later life that the time spent living with the Mohawks was the happiest of his life. These skills would serve him well later.  Christopher would be back in England when the American Revolutionary War broke out in 1775.

In May 1776, Captain Christopher Carleton arrived at Quebec City as part of a relief force for his uncle Sir Guy Carleton, as he was now, besieged in the city by the Continental Army forces.  During the campaign leading up to the Battle of Valcour Island, Capt. Christopher Carleton served on his uncle's staff and in command of detachments of Indian allies. In 1777, Christopher purchased a major's commission in the 29th Regiment of Foot, in which his uncle, Thomas Carleton, was a lieutenant colonel.

Raids

In the autumn of 1778, Major Chistopher Carleton led a raid along the shores of Lake Champlain burning the towns along Otter Creek in Vermont and taking the local militia men prisoner. Carleton's Raid was very successful, destroying enough supplies for 12,000 men for a four-month campaign. Maj. Carleton also showed that he was an expert in leading Native American warriors along with British Regulars and Loyalist troops, a feat that not many British officers could claim. His time spent with the Mohawks in his youth had paid off.

During the Burning of the Valleys campaign of 1780, Maj. Carleton lead another raid down Lake Champlain into the upper Hudson Valley capturing the forts at Fort Ann and Fort George with a mixed force of British Regulars, Loyalist troops, Hessians and Indians, including the 29th's unique ranger company of John Enys.

The years spent on the cold northern frontiers of North America took their toll on now Lieutenant-Colonel Christopher Carleton's health and he died on June 14, 1787, at Quebec City.

Notes

Sources
The American Journals of Lt. John Enys, John Enys and Elizabeth Cometti (editor), Syracuse University Press 1976
The Burning of the Valleys, Gavin K. Watt, Dundurn Press 1997
Carleton's Raid, Ida H. Washington and Paul A. Washington, Cherry Tree Books 1977
Letters of Brunswick and Hessian Officers During The American Revolution, William Stone, translator.  ©1891, Joel Munsell's Sons, Albany, NY.

1749 births
1787 deaths
People from Newcastle upon Tyne
British Army personnel of the American Revolutionary War
East Surrey Regiment officers
29th Regiment of Foot officers
Worcestershire Regiment officers